Orsk Airport  is an international airport in Russia located  south of Orsk. It services medium-sized airliners. The terminal building is located around 3 km from the border to Kazakhstan, with some equipment located in Kazakhstan.

History
The airport was established in 1958. The modern airport building was built in 1982 and the modern artificial runway was laid in 1987.

The airport was the destination of Saratov Airlines Flight 703, which crashed killing 71 people in February 2018.

Airlines and destinations

References

External links

Soviet Air Force bases
Airports built in the Soviet Union
Airports in Orenburg Oblast
Airports established in 1958
1958 establishments in Russia